Hereford railway station serves the city of Hereford, England. Managed by Transport for Wales, it lies on the Welsh Marches Line between Leominster and Abergavenny, is the western terminus of the Cotswold Line and also has an hourly West Midlands Trains service from Birmingham New Street. The station has four platforms for passenger trains and two additional relief lines for goods services.

Accorded 'Secure Station' status in 2004, the station has a staffed ticket office (signposted as a "Travel Centre"), self-service ticket machines, a café and indoor waiting rooms. Automated ticket barriers have been in operation since 28 February 2006.

History

There were originally two stations in Hereford: Barton and Barrs Court.

Hereford Barton  lay to the west of the city and had been built by the Newport, Abergavenny and Hereford Railway (NA&HR). However, Barton was small and in a cramped location, and was not big enough nor could it be enlarged for the greater traffic that would entail from the arrival of the Shrewsbury and Hereford Railway from the north.

The resolution was an agreement to create a new joint railway station to the north-east of the city, called Hereford Barrs Court. This would be a joint standard gauge/broad gauge station, sponsored jointly by the standard-gauge Shrewsbury & Hereford Railway (S&HR) and the GWR-sponsored Hereford, Ross and Gloucester Railway (HR&GR). When the Midland Railway sponsored Hereford, Hay and Brecon Railway entered the town, they were given access rights, as was the later Worcester and Hereford Railway, which joined the S&HR's route to the north of the city at Shelwick Junction.

In civil engineering preparation for this, and as the only company planning to enter the town from the north, the S&HR built a brick works north of Dinmore Hill in 1849, which was fed by clay from the earthworks of digging a tunnel south underneath it. In 1852,  years later and having used  million bricks the tunnel was completed, freight traffic started in July 1852 to provide cash flow. However, construction continued, with the massive earthworks for a cutting to enter Barrs Court started in August 1852.

The plan was to jointly open both stations between all four railways on 6 December 1853, with what was planned to be a Railway Fete. However, the first S&HR passenger service arrived at Barrs Court on Saturday 28 October, which carried the chairman Mr Ormsby-Gore and engineer Thomas Brassey. As the negotiations and financing of the joint station had taken so long, they arrived at an incomplete facility. Whilst completion of the station would follow shortly after, significant rebuilding would occur later in the nineteenth century, when the current Victorian Gothic buildings, designed by R.E. Johnson, would be constructed. The station opened on 6 December 1853, and the name was simplified to Hereford in 1893 on the closure of Barton station to passengers.

In 1866, a line connecting the NA&HR's route to the south of the city, branching off from the line to Barton at Redhill and joining with the HR&GR's route into Barrs Court station from the south, rendered Barton station obsolete, as through north–south services could now utilise the larger and better equipped Barrs Court station. However, Barton clung onto passenger services until January 1893, the last services to use it being Midland Railway trains to Hay-on-Wye and Brecon. It would remain open as a goods only station until 1979, and the route through it from north to south, used as a goods only line to avoid Barrs Court, also remained until approximately this time.

The former branches to Brecon via Hay-on-Wye and Gloucester both closed to passenger traffic in the early 1960s; Brecon services were withdrawn from 31 December 1962, whilst the Gloucester via  line fell victim to the Beeching Axe on 2 November 1964.

The station was designated a Grade II listed building in 1973.

Services 

Hereford is served by trains operated by Great Western Railway, Transport for Wales and West Midlands Trains. It is the terminus of the routes from Birmingham New Street and London Paddington via Worcester Foregate Street  and is served by all trains on the Manchester Piccadilly to Cardiff and Carmarthen route. Trains run hourly to Birmingham, Manchester, Shrewsbury and Cardiff Central (Mon-Sat), two-hourly to Wrexham General, Chester and Holyhead and less frequently to Oxford, Reading and London.

See also
Herefordshire and Gloucestershire Canal

References

Bibliography

External links

Railway stations in Herefordshire
Former Shrewsbury and Hereford Railway stations
Railway stations in Great Britain opened in 1853
Railway stations served by Transport for Wales Rail
Railway stations served by Great Western Railway
Railway stations served by West Midlands Trains
Grade II listed railway stations
1853 establishments in England
DfT Category C1 stations